The Max Kaminsky Trophy is an annual award presented by the Ontario Hockey League (OHL). Originally (1961–1969) awarded to the most gentlemanly player in the league, since 1970 it is awarded to the OHL's most outstanding defenceman.

The award is named in honour of Max Kaminsky, who coached the St. Catharines Teepees to a Memorial Cup win in May 1960; he retired after the Memorial Cup, and died of cancer in May 1961. 

The winner of the Max Kaminsky Trophy is the OHL's nominee for the CHL Defenceman of the Year.

Max Kaminsky Trophy winners (1961–1969)

Max Kaminsky Trophy winners (1970–present)

See also
 Emile Bouchard Trophy – Quebec Major Junior Hockey League Defenceman of the Year
 Bill Hunter Memorial Trophy – Western Hockey League Defenceman of the Year
 List of Canadian Hockey League awards

References

External links
 Ontario Hockey League

Ontario Hockey League trophies and awards
Awards established in 1961